Karl Fröhlich (born 15 April 1944) is a retired Austrian football defender who played for Austria. He also played for FK Austria Wien and SV Admira Wiener Neustadt.

External links

 
 

1944 births
Austrian footballers
Austria international footballers
Association football defenders
FK Austria Wien players
Living people